The Hospital Kuala Lumpur MRT station is a mass rapid transit (MRT) underground station located along Jalan Tun Razak (Circular Road) in downtown Kuala Lumpur, Malaysia. It is one of the stations under the MRT Putrajaya line.

The station began operations on 16 March 2023 as part of Phase Two operations of the Putrajaya Line.

Station details

Location 
The station is located along Jalan Tun Razak, next to its intersection with Jalan Pahang. The station is named after and primarily serves the Kuala Lumpur Hospital, Malaysia's main public hospital, located across Jalan Tun Razak from the station.

Istana Budaya and the National Art Gallery are near the station.

Exits and entrances 
This station consists of 2 entrances and 1 proposed entrance. Entrance A is located within the Hospital Kuala Lumpur grounds, while Entrance B is located next to the Istana Budaya and the famous Titiwangsa Lake.

Feeder buses
Rapid KL 402 from LRT/MRT Maluri to LRT/MRT/Monorail Titiwangsa.

Gallery

References

External links
 Klang Valley Mass Rapid Transit
 Hawk-Eye View

Rapid transit stations in Kuala Lumpur
Sungai Buloh-Serdang-Putrajaya Line
Railway stations scheduled to open in 2023